The Jeep Grand Commander (project code: K8) is a mid-size crossover SUV with three-row seating manufactured by Jeep through the GAC Fiat Chrysler joint venture in China from 2018 to 2022.

Overview

Previewed by the Yuntu Concept, the Grand Commander debuted in April 2018 at the Beijing Auto Show and was launched on the Chinese car market in May 2018. Manufactured by the GAC Fiat joint venture, the Grand Commander is positioned above the locally made KL Cherokee compact CUV. A 5-seater version is also available as the Commander.

The power is sent to either the front wheels or all four wheels via a 9-speed automatic transmission.

Despite its appearance and name, the Grand Commander would not be sold as a successor to the 2006–2010 XK Commander in the North American market, and is unrelated to the Commander produced in Brazil and India.

Following the Stellantis' withdrawal from GAC FCA joint-venture announced later in July 2022, Jeep has phased out its local manufacturing in China. Thus, Grand Commander market presence ceased after 4 years and modest sales.

Plug-in hybrid 

The Commander PHEV is Jeep's first electric vehicle product in China. The plug-in hybrid vehicle features a 13 kWh lithium-ion battery pack stored underneath the floor, and can be fully recharged in two hours using a 220V 30A charging station and the 6.6 kWh on-board charger. 8 hours are need to fully charge the vehicle using the standard charging equipment that comes with the vehicle. Four E-drive modes including Hybrid, Electric, E-Save and Sport are available and selection could be done via a rotary switch in the center console. The E-Save mode maintains battery, while Sport mode produces maximum output.

Due to the battery placement, the PHEV is only available as 5 seater. In 2020, the name was changed from Commander PHEV to Grand Commander PHEV, and renamed again to Grand Commander e with the 2022 facelift.

Sales

Notes

References

External links

Official site

All-wheel-drive vehicles
Grand Commander
Crossover sport utility vehicles
Mid-size sport utility vehicles
Cars introduced in 2018
Cars of China